Bethlehem Brotherhood and Development was a candidature bloc that contested the May 2005 municipal elections in Bethlehem, the West Bank. Politically independent, the list included members of the Popular Front for the Liberation of Palestine. In total, the bloc presented 15 candidates (8 Christians and 7 Muslims). The top candidate of the Bloc was Victor Batarseh, who was elected mayor.

References

External links
Candidate List
Election Programme
2005 establishments in the Palestinian territories
Bethlehem municipal election blocs
Defunct political party alliances in the Palestinian territories
Popular Front for the Liberation of Palestine